The following list of Spanish general officers (Peninsular War) lists the generals and other general officers who served in the Army of Spain during the Peninsular War (1808–1814). The rank given refers to the ones held until the end of the war in 1814. The list includes foreign nationals who fought in Spanish military units.

Overview
Napoleon had intended the campaign on the Peninsula to be a walkover, but what he would come to call the Spanish Ulcer, ended up with him having to send in thirteen of his maréchals, and enter Madrid himself. Apart from the original 28,000 troops that had entered Spain under Junot, heading for Portugal, he would have to send in a further two hundred and seventy thousand men — more than half of the empire’s total military strength.

List

See also
Chronology of events of the Peninsular War
List of French general officers (Peninsular War)
List of Portuguese general officers (Peninsular War)

References

Spanish generals
Peninsular War officers

 
Spanish peninsula